The Leader of the Opposition of the Karnataka Legislative Council in Karnataka Legislative Council is an elected Member of Karnataka Legislative Council who leads the official opposition in the Upper house of the Karnataka Legislature. The Leader of the opposition Karnataka Legislative Council is the Legislature chairperson of the party with the most seats after the government party.

Leaders of opposition

References 

Karnataka
Karnataka politics-related lists